This is a list of animal and plant symbols of the Canary Islands as a whole and each of the islands. These species were established as symbols by Decree Law of April 30, 1991 by the Government of the Canary Islands.

Animal and plant symbol of the archipelago as a whole:

Animal and plant symbol of each of the islands:

References

External links
 Los símbolos de la naturaleza para las islas Canarias
 Proyecto símbolos. Símbolos de la Naturaleza para las Islas Canarias

Canary Islands
Fauna of the Canary Islands
Flora of the Canary Islands
Canary Islands